The 1991 season was the Minnesota Vikings' 31st in the National Football League. They finished with an 8–8 record, improving on their 6–10 record from the previous season, and missed the playoffs for the second straight year. Head coach Jerry Burns retired at the end of the season.

Herschel Walker, going into his third year with Minnesota, went through another season of frustration and he was released following the season. In his two-and-a-half seasons with the Vikings, he failed to record a 1,000-yard season. The infamous trade that brought Walker to Minnesota never lived up to expectations and allowed the Dallas Cowboys to use two of the draft picks they received in the trade on Emmitt Smith and Darren Woodson, who became part of a dominant team that won three Super Bowls in the 1990s.

Offseason

1991 Draft

Draft trades

Staff

Roster

Preseason

Regular season

Schedule

Standings

Statistics

Team leaders

League rankings

References

External links
 1991 Minnesota Vikings Statistics & Players on Pro-Football-Reference

1991
Minnesota
Minnesota